Lieutenant-Commander John Austin Gaimes, DSO, was a submarine commander for the Royal Navy. He died 20 January 1921, at the age of 33, when HMS K5 sank with the loss of all hands during a mock battle in the Bay of Biscay.

History of service 
 1901, posted to the training ship HMS Britannia.
 Served as second-in-command of the destroyer HMS Syren for a year.
 Volunteered for British submarine command in 1908, appointed January 1909.
 Served on the C-class submarines.
 Appointed command of HMS A9 on 5 October 1911.
 A year later, appointed command of HMS B9.
 March 1913, captained HMS C37 in Hong Kong.
 10 April 1917, commanded submarine in Harwich flotilla.
 Located the secret Heligoland passage, marked out by buoys for German warships to follow.
 June 1918, awarded the Distinguished Service Order (DSO) for war services.
 After World War I, commanded submarines attached to depot ship HMS Dolphin at Portsmouth.
 November 1919, appointed to cruiser HMS Inconstant for steam-driven vessels of the K-class in the First Flotilla.
 1 April 1920, appointed command of HMS K5.

References 

1887 births
1921 deaths
Companions of the Distinguished Service Order
People educated at Stubbington House School
People educated at The Skinners' School
People lost at sea
Royal Navy submarine commanders
Royal Navy officers of World War I